The Goes TV Tower is a broadcast tower near Goes, Netherlands.
 
The tower was the first TV tower in the Netherlands, and is currently owned by Alticom, but the area around the tower is owned by KPN, whilst the antenna is owned by NOVEC. In 2007 a new antenna was installed, which is  shorter than the previous antenna. Together with the mast, the Goes telecommunication tower is 137 metres high. The tower is used not only for television, but also for radio and telephone. The construction of the tower in Gus was even given priority because of the possibility of using it for telephone connections. During the floods of 1953 many telephone cables were destroyed and people noticed how important it was to have other equipment for that.
Construction of the tower began in 1955. A new technological process was used. Liquid concrete was poured layer by layer on the hardened concrete. The transmission tower was then placed on top of the concrete tower.

References 

Goes
Towers in Zeeland
Communication towers in the Netherlands
Towers completed in 1955
1955 in the Netherlands
Concrete buildings and structures
Television in the Netherlands
1955 establishments in the Netherlands
20th-century architecture in the Netherlands